The men's 1500 metres at the 1986 Asian Winter Games was held on 2 March 1986 in Sapporo, Japan.

Records

Results

 Hwang Ik-hwan was awarded bronze because of no three-medal sweep per country rule.

References
Results

External links
Changchun 2007 Official website

Men 1500